The Camel Cup is an annual camel racing festival held in Australia. The race usually takes place at Blatherskite Park in the town Alice Springs, Northern Territory. The event is organised by the  Apex Club of Central Australia.

History
The first such event was held in 1970 in the dry bed of Todd River between two Lions club members, in an ephemeral river in the southern Northern Territory. It soon became a part of the Alice Springs Centenary Year Celebrations. The popularity of the event was recognised by the Alice Springs Lions Club, and it started its annual celebration in the Traeger Park, but due to security reasons it was shifted to Arunga Park Speedway. It was 1979 when the race was transferred to purpose built camel race track the located at Blatherskite Park.

See also

Sport in the Northern Territory

References

External links
Official Camel Cup website
Apex Club of Central Australia

1970 establishments in Australia
Recurring sporting events established in 1970
Animal racing
Camels
Sports competitions in the Northern Territory
Sport in Alice Springs
Lions Clubs International
Sports competitions in Australia